Rob Ruck is an American historian and author. He is a professor of history at the University of Pittsburgh.

Books
Tropic of Football: The Long and Perilous Journey of Samoans to the NFL (The New Press, 2018)
Raceball: How the Major Leagues Colonized the Black and Latin Game (Beacon Press, 2011)
Rooney: A Sporting Life (with Maggie Jones Patterson and Michael Weber) (University of Nebraska Press, 2010)
The Tropic of Baseball: Baseball in the Dominican Republic (University of Nebraska Press, 1999)
Sandlot Seasons: Sport in Black Pittsburgh (University of Illinois Press, 1993)
Steve Nelson, American Radical (University of Pittsburgh Press, 1981) with Steve Nelson and James Barrett

Television
The Republic of Baseball: Dominican Giants of the American Game (with Dan Manatt)  (PBS: 2006-2008)

References

Sports historians

American historians

Living people
Year of birth missing (living people)